Tun Dr. Siti Hasmah binti Haji Mohamad Ali (Jawi: سيتي حسمه بنت محمد علي; born 12 July 1926) is the spouse and wife of Mahathir Mohamad, the 4th and 7th Prime Minister of Malaysia.  She played the role of Spouse of the Prime Minister of Malaysia from July 1981 to October 2003 and from May 2018 to March 2020 for almost 24 years. She is the oldest-living person of the role. She was also the former chancellor of the Multimedia University of Malaysia.

Early life and family
Born in Klang, Selangor on 12 July 1926, Siti Hasmah is an ethnic Malay (retired) physician of Minangkabau descent from Negeri Sembilan, Malaysia. She schooled in SMK St. Mary. She obtained her MBBS from the University of Malaya in Singapore. Tun Siti Hasmah was one of the first Malay women to enroll for a medical course at the King Edward VII College of Medicine in Singapore (now the Yong Loo Lin School of Medicine) after World War II.

In 1955 she graduated as a medical doctor from the Faculty of Medicine, Universiti Malaya, which was then located in Singapore. She subsequently joined the government health service. She was one of the first Malay woman doctors in then Malaya. She married Mahathir the following year in August. They have seven children, Marina, Mirzan, Melinda, Mokhzani, Mukhriz, Maizura and Mazhar.

In 1966, she attended a public health certificate program at the School of Public Health, the University of Michigan.

Ten years later, she became the first woman to be appointed Medical Officer in the Maternal and Child Health Department, and in 1974, she was the first woman to be appointed the State Maternal and Child Health Officer. She is also the author of several articles on family medicine and the socioeconomic factors associated with pregnancy and childbearing in Malaysia.

Known to be a loving person, Siti Hasmah is a cat lover and music enthusiast.

Wife of Prime Minister of Malaysia

Siti Hasmah became the wife of Malaysia prime minister following the appointment of her husband as Prime Minister in 1981.

She used her position as the wife of the Prime Minister to campaign tirelessly for women's health, family planning, drug abuse control and adult literacy. She also served in various positions as follows:

 President of the Malaysian Girl Guides Association
 Chairman of the Kedah Family Planning Association
 President of the Malaysian Medical Association Foundation
 President of the Association for the Rehabilitation of Handicapped Children
 Vice-President of the Federation of Family Planning Associations of Malaysia
 Patron of the Malaysian Association of Maternal Health and Neonate
 Patron of the Malaysian Pediatric Association
 Patron of the Badminton Association of Malaysia (BAM)

As Patron of the Pan Pacific South Asia Women's Association, (PPSEAWA) Malaysia, Siti Hasmah attended and presented keynote addresses at the Triennial Conferences in Tokyo (1984), Bangkok (1991) and Tonga (1994).  

She again served as the wife of the prime minister after her husband was reappointed on May 10, 2018.

Social contributions

Drug abuse
As President of BAKTI (Welfare Club of the Wives of Ministers and Deputy Ministers), Siti Hasmah was active in efforts to educate young people about the dangers of drug abuse. In 1985, at the invitation of United States First Lady Nancy Reagan, she attended the First Ladies' Conference on Drug Abuse in Washington D.C. She also represented Malaysia at the International Conference on Drug Abuse and Illicit Trafficking in Vienna in 1987.

Rural women
Siti Hasmah was also active internationally in promoting the cause of rural women. In 1992, at the invitation of Queen Fabiola of Belgium, she attended the First Ladies Summit for the Economic Advancement of Rural Women in Geneva. She was chosen as one of the six Core-Group Initiators of First Ladies representing the Asia-Pacific Region.

The summit was initiated by the International Fund for Agricultural Development (IFAD) under the patronage of Queen Fabiola. At the end of the Summit, the First Ladies endorsed the Geneva Declaration on Rural Women, an instrument to formulate policies and programmes to enhance the economic advancement and welfare of rural women and their families.

At the summit, Siti Hasmah stressed the "with proper education and training, rural women can help raise literate and productive children who, in turn, can be positive contributors to a nation's growth and prosperity."

In February 1994, Siti Hasmah attended the ISC Council Meeting in Brussels at the invitation of Queen Fabiola. Then, in September 1995, she was appointed as Chairperson of Regional Steering Committee on the Economic Advancement of Rural and Island Women for Asia Pacific Region.

Eventually, in November 1996, she took over the presidency of the International Steering Committee for Economic Advancement of Rural and Island Women for Asia Pacific Region.

Mental health
Being a medical doctor by training, Siti Hasmah also has an interest in mental health. Former First Lady of the United States, Rosalynn Carter invited Siti Hasmah to serve on the National Committee of the World Federation of Mental Health which Mrs Carter chaired.

Awards and recognitions
For her life-long of public service, her voluntary work, and her leadership in the fields of public health, literacy and drug abuse control, Siti Hasmah has received many awards. 

In 1988, she was awarded the Kazue McLaren Award by the Asia Pacific Consortium for Public Health.

In 1991, Universiti Kebangsaan Malaysia conferred on her the Honorary Doctorate in Medical Science.

In 1992, the Royal College of Physicians, Ireland, conferred on her the Honorary Doctorate in Public Health.

In May 1994, Indiana University, Bloomington conferred on Siti Hasmah the Honorary Doctorate of Humane Letters, and in August the same year, she received an Honorary Doctorate of Law from the University of Victoria, British Columbia, Canada.

In 2018, Perdana University conferred on her the Honorary Doctor of Philosophy Degree for Women and Community Development.

On 20 June 1997 she was appointed as the Chancellor, Multimedia University (MMU) and patrons MESCORP.

On 18 December 2020, women's magazine Nona presented Siti Hasmah with the Nona Superwoman Award 2020.

Honours
The Yang di-Pertuan Agong (King) of Malaysia., as well as several Heads of States, have bestowed titles upon her. In 2003, she was conferred the highest honorary title of Tun along with her husband, Dr Mahathir, by the Yang di-Pertuan Agong.

Honours of Malaysia
  :
  Officer of the Order of the Defender of the Realm (KMN) (1975)
  Grand Commander of the Order of Loyalty to the Crown of Malaysia (SSM) – Tun (2003)
  :
 State of Kedah Distinguished Service Medal (PCK)
 Companion of the Exalted Order of the Crown of Kedah (SMK) (1971)
 Knight Grand Companion of the Order of Loyalty to the Royal House of Kedah (SSDK) – Dato' Seri (1983)
  :
  Knight Grand Commander of the Order of the Defender of State (DUPN) – Dato' Seri Utama (2003)
  :
  Grand Commander of the Order of Kinabalu (SPDK) – Datuk Seri Panglima (1994)
  :
  Knight Grand Commander of the Premier and Exalted Order of Malacca (DUNM) – Datuk Seri Utama (2003)
  :
  Knight Commander of the Order of the Crown of Selangor (DPMS) – Datin Paduka (1983, returned 2017)
  Knight Grand Commander of the Order of the Crown of Selangor (SPMS) – Datin Paduka Seri (1994, returned 2017)
  :
  Knight Commander of the Order of the Star of Hornbill Sarawak (DA) – Datuk Amar (1996)

In popular culture

Siti Hasmah has been portrayed in a theater,documentary and films, She was portrayed by Erra Fazira in the theater Tun Mahathir Musical (2010) and two films played by Fadhilah Mansor in Kapsul (2016) and by Fauziah Latiff in Mahathir:The Long Journey (2022 or 2023 because shot in 2019 and early 2020 before Movement control order Covid 19 Pandemic in Malaysia.
She appeared in a 2015 Malaysian film, Kapsul played by Fadilah Mansor

Publications
 My Name is Hasmah. Karangkraf Group, 2016.

See also
 Spouse of the Prime Minister of Malaysia

References

1926 births
Living people
Mahathir Mohamad family
University of Malaya alumni
Malaysian medical doctors
Multimedia University
Malaysian Muslims
Malaysian people of Malay descent
National University of Singapore alumni
Malaysian people of Minangkabau descent
Spouses of prime ministers of Malaysia
Spouses of Deputy Prime Ministers of Malaysia
Grand Commanders of the Order of Kinabalu
University of Michigan School of Public Health alumni
Grand Commanders of the Order of Loyalty to the Crown of Malaysia
Officers of the Order of the Defender of the Realm